Navy Captain (later Commander) Temi Ejoor was a Nigerian Military Administrator of Enugu State (December 1993 – September 1994) and then of Abia State (September 1994 – August 1996) during the military regime of General Sani Abacha.

Temi Ejoor was born in Ughelli in Delta State.
He is an alumnus of Hussey College Warri.

The concept of Obuaku City was conceived during his rule, as a new city to provide homes for people working in the nearby big cities of Aba and Port Harcourt, but little progress was made.

References

Nigerian Navy officers
Living people
Governors of Enugu State
Governors of Abia State
Hussey College Warri alumni
Year of birth missing (living people)